24 Frames is a 2017 Iranian experimental film directed by Abbas Kiarostami. It was his final feature film before his death in July 2016. It was posthumously shown in the 70th Anniversary Events section at the 2017 Cannes Film Festival.

Release
24 Frames premiered at the 70th Cannes Film Festival on 23 May 2017. In the United States, Janus Films began the film's limited release on 2 February 2018 at the Film Society of Lincoln Center.

Critical reception
On review aggregator website Rotten Tomatoes, the film has an approval rating of 92% based on 53 reviews, with an average rating of 7.6/10. The website's critical consensus reads, "24 Frames offers Kiarostami fans one final, affecting reminder of what made this filmmaker a talent to treasure." On Metacritic, which assigns a normalized rating to reviews, the film has a weighted average score of 77 out of 100, based on 15 critics, indicating "generally favorable reviews".

References

External links
Janus Films official site

24 Frames: The World Made Visible an essay by Bilge Ebiri at the Criterion Collection

2017 films
2017 drama films
Films directed by Abbas Kiarostami
Iranian drama films
2010s Persian-language films